The Girls may be:

Books
 The Girls (Lansens novel), a 2005 novel by Lori Lansens
 The Girls (Cline novel), a 2016 novel by Emma Cline
 The Girls, a 1921 novel by Edna Ferber

Films
 The Girls (1961 film), a Soviet comedy film
 The Girls (1968 film), a Swedish drama film
 The Girl (1987 film), a British-Swedish drama film

Music
 The Girls (musical), a musical based on Calendar Girls
 The Girls (Seattle band), Seattle punk band
 The Girls (1960s band), an American all-female band from the '60s
 "The Girls" (song), a song by Calvin Harris

See also 
 Girl (disambiguation)
 Girls (disambiguation)